The Yale-Griffin Prevention Research Center is one of the Centers for Disease Control (CDC)'s 26 Prevention Research Centers. It was established in 1998 with a grant from the CDC. It is part of the Yale School of Public Health, and is based at Griffin Hospital in Derby, Connecticut. It also operates out of the Community Alliance for Research Engagement at Yale University. Its focuses are the prevention and treatment of chronic diseases such as obesity and heart disease.

References

External links

Organizations established in 1998
Centers for Disease Control and Prevention
1998 establishments in Connecticut
Medical research institutes in the United States
Organizations based in Connecticut
Research institutes in Connecticut